Nodulotrophon is a genus of sea snails, marine gastropod mollusks in the family Muricidae, the murex snails or rock snails.

Species
Species within the genus Nodulotrophon include:

 Nodulotrophon coronatus (H. Adams & A. Adams, 1864)
 Nodulotrophon raymondi (Moody, 1916)
 Nodulotrophon scolopax (Watson, 1882)
 Nodulotrophon septus (Watson, 1882)

References